Nyambe is God of the Bassa, Cameroon.

References

Religion in Cameroon
Bassa people (Cameroon)